The Philadelphia Phillies are a Major League Baseball team based in Philadelphia, Pennsylvania. They  are a member of the Eastern Division of Major League Baseball's National League. The team has played officially under two names since beginning play in 1883: the current moniker, as well as the "Quakers", which was used in conjunction with "Phillies" during the team's early history. The team was also known unofficially as the "Blue Jays" during the World War II era. Since the franchise's inception,  players have made an appearance in a competitive game for the team, whether as an offensive player (batting and baserunning) or a defensive player (fielding, pitching, or both).

Of those  Phillies, 58 have had surnames beginning with the letter T, 6 have had names beginning with U, and 24 have had surnames beginning with the letter V. One player, Sam Thompson, has been inducted into the Baseball Hall of Fame; he played ten seasons (1889–1898) for Philadelphia and set the franchise's record for most triples in a single season in 1894. The Hall of Fame lists the Phillies as Thompson's primary team, and he is a member of the Philadelphia Baseball Wall of Fame, as are second baseman Tony Taylor; Elmer Valo, who was inducted for his contributions as a member of the crosstown Philadelphia Athletics; and John Vukovich, who was primarily a third baseman during his playing days with the Phillies and was inducted for his years of service to the Phillies. In addition to three tenures as a player (1970–1971, 1976–1977, 1979–1981), Vukovich was a coach and team advisor from 1983 to 2004.

Among the 54 batters in this list, Tuck Turner has the best batting average; he batted .380 in four seasons with Philadelphia. Other players with an average above .300 include Thompson (.334 in ten seasons), Cotton Tierney (.317 in one season), and Andy Tracy (.357 in two seasons). Chase Utley leads all players on this list with 188 home runs, and Thompson's 963 runs batted in are best. In home runs, Jim Thome and Shane Victorino lead all players with surnames starting with T and V, with 96 and 79, respectively; in runs batted in, the U and V leaders are Utley (694) and Victorino (350).

Of this list's 34 pitchers, Bobby Thigpen has the best win–loss record, in terms of winning percentage; he won three games and lost one for a win ratio of .750 in his only season with Philadelphia. Jack Taylor leads this list with 96 victories and 77 defeats, and Wayne Twitchell has the most strikeouts, with 573. Erskine Thomason's 0.00 earned run average (ERA) is the lowest mark on this list; among pitchers who have allowed an earned run, Kent Tekulve, who holds the franchise's single-season record for appearances by a pitcher, has the best mark, with a 3.01 ERA. Among pitchers whose surnames begin with U, Tom Underwood has the best win–loss record, in terms of winning percentage; he won 28 games and lost 20 for a win ratio of .583 in his four seasons with Philadelphia. Underwood's 28 victories are the best among pitchers on this list whose names begin with U; Tom Vickery shares the mark among V-named pitchers. Dutch Ulrich has the most defeats among pitchers whose surnames start with U, with 27 in three seasons. Underwood has 245 strikeouts, best among the U-named pitchers; Vickery leads pitchers whose surnames begin with V in that category, with 177. Al Verdel has the best earned run average (ERA) among pitchers whose surnames start with V; he allowed no runs in his only career appearance for an ERA of 0.00. Ulrich's 3.48 ERA leads the pitchers whose surnames begin with U.

Footnotes
Key
 The National Baseball Hall of Fame and Museum determines which cap a player wears on their plaque, signifying "the team with which he made his most indelible mark". The Hall of Fame considers the player's wishes in making their decision, but the Hall makes the final decision as "it is important that the logo be emblematic of the historical accomplishments of that player's career".
 Players are listed at a position if they appeared in 30% of their games or more during their Phillies career, as defined by Baseball-Reference.com. Additional positions may be shown on the Baseball-Reference website by following each player's citation.
 Franchise batting and pitching leaders are drawn from Baseball-Reference.com. A total of 1,500 plate appearances are needed to qualify for batting records, and 500 innings pitched or 50 decisions are required to qualify for pitching records.
 Statistics are correct as of the end of the 2010 Major League Baseball season.

Table
Turkey Tyson is listed by Baseball-Reference without a position; he never appeared in a game in the field in his major league career.
Fred Van Dusen is listed by Baseball-Reference without a position; he never appeared in a game in the field in his major league career.

References
General

Inline citations

T